The Republican Alternative Party (ReAl) is a movement and political party in Azerbaijan that was established in January 2009 and officially registered on 1 September 2020.

History 
According to the constitution, which was amended in a referendum in 2009, "one person being able to be elected president more than twice" set REAL in motion. REAL saw this as damage and betrayal of the foundations of the republic. The REAL Movement was founded on Facebook in 2009.

Ilgar Mammadov, who wanted to run in the 2013 presidential election, attended rallies in Ismayilli. Ilgar Mammadov was sentenced to 7 years in prison for violating public order.

Congresses

First Constituent Assembly 
The first attempt to hold the founding congress was made on 29 October 2017. Information on this was announced on 24 January 2014. However, the Baku City Executive Power rejected REAL's request to allocate a place for the congress.

The Constituent Assembly Initiative Group again appealed to the authorities to provide a venue for the convention on 4, 5, 11, 12, 18, 19, 25 and 26 November or the first week of December. However, the executive power also rejected this appeal.

References

2009 establishments in Azerbaijan
Political parties established in 2018
Azerbaijani democracy movements
Liberal parties in Azerbaijan
National liberal parties
Political parties in Azerbaijan
Pro-European political parties in Azerbaijan